The 2006 Brantford municipal election was held on November 13, 2006, to elect a mayor, councillors, and school trustees in the city of Brantford, Ontario.

Results (partial)

Fred Minna supported the Progressive Conservative Party of Ontario and the Progressive Conservative Party of Canada in the late 1990s and early 2000s. He wrote a letter endorsing the provincial government of Mike Harris in the 1999 provincial election and was the vote organizer for Brant in the 2003 Progressive Conservative Party of Canada leadership convention. He sought election to the Brantford city council in 1997 and 2006, finishing third both times.

Russell H. Skelton ran unsuccessfully for Brantford City Council in 1994, 2003, and 2006. Thirty-eight years old during the 2003 election, he ran on a platform of greater consultation with the electorate and increased road safety.
Duane LeeAllen has been active with Brant Artscapes. He was thirty-four years old during the 2006 election. LeeAllen ran in opposition to the city's proposed culture plan, arguing that it inappropriately privileged the non-profit sector to the detriment of private businesses. He also pledged to make culture events more affordable for low-income residents.

Dale Renout is a Baptist clergyman. He has a bachelor's degree in religious education and described himself as working toward a Master of Divinity in 2006. He has served on the Grand Erie board's special education committee. Renout has run for public office on four occasions. He ran for the Brant County Public School Board and its successor Grand Erie District School Board in 1994, 2000, and 2006, and also for the Brantford city council's fifth ward in 1997. Renout wrote an equivocal public letter on the invasion of Iraq in 2003, saying that he was "not a proponent of war" but adding that, in his view, some justice was needed for the victims of Iraq's regime. Although Renout was personally opposed to same-sex marriage, he described some same-sex marriage opposition in Canada as "hate mongering" and called for churches to focus on humanitarian issues. In 2006, he wrote in favour of continuing Canada's military mission in Afghanistan. He has been critical of both the federal Conservative Party and the federal Liberal Party for their records in office.

Source: Official results: City of Brantford.

References

2006 Ontario municipal elections
2006